Ordibehesht‌ or Ardibehesht is the second month of the Solar Hijri calendar, which is used officially in Iran and Afghanistan. It has 31 days and spans the months of April and May in the Gregorian calendar. The Afghan Persian name for the month is Saur or Sowr.

Its associated astrological sign in the tropical zodiac is Taurus.

Ordibehesht is the second month of the spring season, and is followed by the month of Khordad.

Events 
 13, S.H. 1265 – Haymarket affair (first police confrontation against workers' groups in Chicago)
 4, S.H. 1294 – Landing at Anzac Cove (part of the Gallipoli campaign of World War I)
 19. S.H. 1299 - Kiev Victory Parade (1920)
 5, S.H. 1324 – National Liberation Committee declares war against the Nazi-backed Italian Social Republic
 18, S.H. 1324 – End of World War II in Europe
 1, S.H. 1346 – Coup d'état in the Kingdom of Greece
 3, S.H. 1353 – Carnation Revolution (in the Portuguese Empire)
 10, S.H. 1354 – Fall of Saigon (part of the Vietnam War)
 6, S.H. 1365 – Chernobyl disaster (in the Ukrainian SSR of the Soviet Union)
 22, S.H. 1377 – Fall of Suharto (1998 riots in Indonesia following the Trisakti shootings; Suharto resigns as Indonesian president on 31 Ordibehesht)
 26, S.H. 1382 – 2003 Casablanca bombings (series of suicide bombings by Muslim militants in Morocco)

Holidays 
 4/5 Ordibehesht – Freedom Day (Portugal)
 5/6 Ordibehesht – Anzac Day and Liberation Day (Italy)
 10 Ordibehesht – Persian Gulf National Day
 11 or 12 Ordibehesht – International Workers' Day and U.S. Loyalty Day
 15 or 16 Ordibehesht - Star Wars Day
 18 or 19 Ordibehesht – Victory in Europe Day
 19 or 20 Ordibehesht– Victory Day (9 May)
 Final Saturday – U.S. Armed Forces Day

Deaths 

 Day 2, S.H. 1373 – Richard Nixon, 37th president of the United States
 Day 17, S.H. 1391 – Iraj Ghaderi, Iranian film director and actor
 Day 24, S.H. 1392 – Mohammad Ezodin Hosseini Zanjani, Iranian Twelver Shia cleric

References 

Months of the Iranian calendar